Wickrange is a village in the commune of Reckange-sur-Mess, in south-western Luxembourg. , the village has a population of 107.

Reckange-sur-Mess
Villages in Luxembourg